New York's 24th State Senate district is one of 63 districts in the New York State Senate. It has been represented by Republican Andrew Lanza since 2007. District 24 is the most Republican-leaning district in the State Senate, and is the only district in New York City to be represented by a Republican.

Geography
District 24 covers the southern two-thirds of Staten Island, including the southernmost point in the state of New York.

The district is located entirely within New York's 11th congressional district, and overlaps with the 61st, 62nd, 63rd, and 64th districts of the New York State Assembly.

Recent election results

2022

2020

2018

2016

2014

2012

Federal results in District 24

References

24